Jabodon is a historic vacation resort in the Town of Washington, Vilas County, Wisconsin. The resort is located on Cranberry Lake in the Eagle River Chain of Lakes and exemplifies Northern Wisconsin vacation resorts of the early 20th century. Land was set aside for Jabodon in 1922 by the Everett Resort, a larger resort established in the 1890s. Jabodon's main house, an American Craftsman house, was constructed in 1924; its boathouse was likely built in the same year. The original boathouse later burned in a fire and was rebuilt in 1937. Additional amenities such as a swimming pool and tennis courts were added to the site in the 1940s.  Jabodon was added to the National Register of Historic Places on March 25, 2009.

References

Hotel buildings on the National Register of Historic Places in Wisconsin
Hotel buildings completed in 1924
Buildings and structures in Vilas County, Wisconsin
National Register of Historic Places in Vilas County, Wisconsin